The World Council of Optometry (WCO) is a membership organization for the development of optometry (eye care) internationally. The WCO is the first and only optometric organization to have official relations with the World Health Organization (WHO) which represents 250,000 optometrists from 75 member organizations in over 40 countries.
The WCO organizes the World Congress of Optometry.

In 2015, the WCO relocated to the American Optometric Association (AOA) headquarters in St Louis, Missouri, United States.

See also
 American Optometric Association
 Eastern Mediterranean Council of Optometry
 European Academy of Optometry and Optics

References

External links
 World Council of Optometry website

Organizations with year of establishment missing
Non-profit organizations based in St. Louis
International medical and health organizations
Optometry